Chalfont station is a SEPTA Regional Rail station in Chalfont, Pennsylvania. Located at Sunset Avenue and Main Street, it serves the Lansdale/Doylestown Line. In FY 2013, Chalfont station had a weekday average of 136 boardings and 143 alightings. The station has a small shelter with overhead heat lamps that can be activated in the winter.

Station layout

References

External links
SEPTA – Chalfont Station
Existing Railroad Stations in Bucks County, Pennsylvania
2000 Don Dorflinger Photo
Original Chalfront Station
 Station from Google Maps Street View

SEPTA Regional Rail stations
Stations on the Doylestown Line
Railway stations in Bucks County, Pennsylvania